Nataliya Lisitsa (born 29 May 1961) is a Russian luger. She competed in the women's singles event at the 1984 Winter Olympics.

References

1961 births
Living people
Russian female lugers
Olympic lugers of the Soviet Union
Lugers at the 1984 Winter Olympics